The International Junior Heavyweight Championship is a professional wrestling title in Japanese promotion Pro Wrestling Zero1 (formerly Pro Wrestling Zero-One and Pro Wrestling Zero1-Max) and formerly sanctioned by the Wrestling Superstars Live promotion, contested exclusively among junior heavyweight (<) wrestlers. It was originally created on June 29, 2002 as the NWA/UPW/Zero-One International Junior Heavyweight Championship, symbolizing Zero-One's relationship with the NWA and UPW; Leonardo Spanky defeated Smelly to become the first champion. When Zero-One left the NWA on October 31, 2004, the title was renamed to incorporate Steve Corino's Pro Wrestling World-1; the name was further added to when the newly renamed Zero1-Max joined the AWA on February 28, 2005. On August 26, 2006, when Minoru Fujita won the annual Tenka-Ichi Junior Tournament, it was again renamed the AWA World Junior Heavyweight Championship. When Zero1-Max left the AWA on December 15, 2007, it was renamed again to the Zero1-Max International Junior Heavyweight Championship. Finally, when the company changed its name to Pro Wrestling Zero1 in 2008, the championship followed. 

There have been a total of 25 recognized champions, who have had a combined 35 official reigns. The current champion is Leo Isaka who is in his first reign.

Title history

Combined reigns

See also

List of National Wrestling Alliance championships
World Junior Heavyweight Championship (Zero1)
NWA World Junior Heavyweight Championship
NWA International Junior Heavyweight Championship
WAR International Junior Heavyweight Championship

Footnotes

References

External links
ZEROONEUSA title history
Wrestling-Titles.com title history (International Junior Heavyweight Championship)
Wrestling-Titles.com title history (AWA World Junior Heavyweight Championship)
TitleHistories.com title history (International Junior Heavyweight Championship)
TitleHistories.com title history (AWA World Junior Heavyweight Championship)

Pro Wrestling Zero1 championships
Junior heavyweight wrestling championships
International professional wrestling championships